Chosenia arbutifolia (syn. Salix arbutifolia Pall.) is a flowering plant in the family Salicaceae, native to Korea, Northeast China, Sakhalin, Kamchatka and the Russian Far East.

Its name is taken from the Joseon dynasty which ruled Korea until 1897. It is the sole member of genus Chosenia, but is included within the closely related genus Salix by some authors.

It is a deciduous, willow-like wind-pollinated tree generally reaching a height of 20–30 m with a columnar crown and grey-brown peeling bark. The leaves are 5–8 cm long and 1.5-2.3 cm broad, with a very finely serrated to nearly entire margin, and an acuminate apex. The flowers are aggregated in pendulous catkins 1–3 cm long; it is dioecious, with male and female flowers on separate trees. Chosenias are fast-growing pioneer trees on sand and pebble river banks.

Traditionally distributed alongside mountain river banks, owing to its favorable characteristics such as strong stress resistance and fast growth it would be useful for landscape planting, but is hard to propagate and has been categorized as endangered in China. A high-quality chromosome-level genome has been produced with a total size of 338.93 Mb to provide comprehensive information for germplasm protection and future functional genomic studies.

References

Salicaceae
Monotypic Malpighiales genera
Flora of Northeast Asia
Trees of Korea
Flora of Korea
Trees of continental subarctic climate
Vulnerable plants
Taxa named by Takenoshin Nakai